Fighting Mustang is a 1948 American Western film directed by Oliver Drake and written by Rita Ross. The film stars Sunset Carson, Al Terry, Pat Starling, Felice Richmond, Polly McKay and William Val. The film was released on February 20, 1948, by Astor Pictures.

Plot

Cast          
Sunset Carson as Sunset Carson
Al Terry as Jed Thomas
Pat Starling as Helen Bennett 
Felice Richmond as Aunt Therese 
Polly McKay as Rita Bennett
William Val as Tim Bennett 
Forrest Matthews as Captain J. C. McCloud 
Lee Roberts as Attorney General Clark
Bob Curtis as Kelly
Joe Hiser as Shorty
Stephen Keyes as Bart Dawson
Tex Wilson as Ace
Al Ferguson as Hank
Hugh Hooker as Warren
Don Gray as Tex
Dale Harrison as Montana

References

External links
 

1948 films
American Western (genre) films
1948 Western (genre) films
Astor Pictures films
Films directed by Oliver Drake
American black-and-white films
1940s English-language films
1940s American films